WWEQ was a Religious-formatted broadcast radio station licensed to and serving Pamplin City, Virginia. WWEQ was owned and operated by Calvary Chapel of Lynchburg.

Calvary Chapel of Lynchburg surrendered WWEQ's license to the Federal Communications Commission on July 21, 2016, and the FCC cancelled the license the same day. The church continues to broadcast on WEQF-FM and WEQP.

Translators
WWEQ increased its broadcast area with the use of the following translator:

W237CL, also owned by Calvary Chapel of Lynchburg, was a translator for WRXT.

References

External links
 EquipFM Online
 

WEQ
Radio stations established in 2010
2010 establishments in Virginia
Radio stations disestablished in 2016
2016 disestablishments in Virginia
Defunct religious radio stations in the United States
WEQ
Calvary Chapel Association